Mexico is a town in Oxford County, Maine, United States. The population was 2,756 at the 2020 census. Mexico is a small mill town for the papermaking industry.

History

The land was once part of Holmanstown Plantation, granted by the Massachusetts General Court in 1789 to Colonel Jonathan Holman of Sutton, Massachusetts (now Millbury) and others. In 1803, Dixfield was set off and incorporated. The plantation's remaining portion, which had been first settled by Isaac Gleason, was incorporated on February 13, 1818 as the town of Mexico. The name was inspired by local sympathy for Mexico's 1810–1821 fight for independence from Spain. Then known as Mexico Corner, it developed as a farming community with mills at the streams. In 1894, George W. Ridlon, president of the Rumford Falls Brick Company, founded a settlement in the eastern part of the town called Ridlonville. He erected 30 cottages and The Hotel Ridlon.

Mexico is located on several hills overlooking the Androscoggin River. Across the river is the town of Rumford, which has a large paper mill. The Swift River empties into the Androscoggin at Mexico's southwest corner, its historic business center positioned in the 19th century near the source of water power. While the large Androscoggin forms Mexico's southern boundary with Rumford, the smaller Swift River more or less follows its western boundary with that town. Mexico's downtown is located on land formed by the northeast corner of the right-angle junction of the two rivers. These low-lying riverbanks in Mexico have flooded many times, including 1936, 1953 and 1987.

Geography

Mexico is drained by the Swift River and the Androscoggin River, which separates it from Rumford Falls.

Demographics

2010 census

As of the census of 2010, there were 2,681 people, 1,185 households, and 735 families living in the town. The racial makeup of the town was 96.6% White, 0.4% African American, 0.4% Native American, 0.9% Asian, 0.3% from other races, and 1.4% from two or more races. Hispanic or Latino of any race were 0.9% of the population.

There were 1,185 households, of which 26.0% had children under the age of 18 living with them, 41.3% were married couples living together, 15.2% had a female householder with no husband present, 5.6% had a male householder with no wife present, and 38.0% were non-families. 29.5% of all households were made up of individuals, and 12.8% had someone living alone who was 65 years of age or older. The average household size was 2.26 and the average family size was 2.72.

The median age in the town was 44.7 years. 19.4% of residents were under the age of 18; 8.8% were between the ages of 18 and 24; 22.1% were from 25 to 44; 32.1% were from 45 to 64; and 17.6% were 65 years of age or older. The gender makeup of the town was 49.3% male and 50.7% female.

2000 census

As of the census of 2000, there were 2,959 people, 1,298 households, and 820 families living in the town. The racial makeup of the town was 97.84% White, 0.24% Black or African American, 0.88% Asian, and 1.05% from two or more races. Hispanic or Latino of any race were 0.27% of the population.

There were 1,298 households, out of which 28.4% had children under the age of 18 living with them, 44.5% were married couples living together, 13.0% had a female householder with no husband present, and 36.8% were non-families. 31.5% of all households were made up of individuals, and 15.5% had someone living alone who was 65 years of age or older.  The average household size was 2.27 and the average family size was 2.80.

In the town, the population was spread out, with 24.0% under the age of 18, 6.7% from 18 to 24, 27.9% from 25 to 44, 21.8% from 45 to 64, and 19.6% who were 65 years of age or older.  The median age was 40 years. For every 100 females, there were 95.6 males.  For every 100 females age 18 and over, there were 91.4 males.

The median income for a household in the town was $27,406, and the median income for a family was $33,776. Males had a median income of $38,214 versus $23,298 for females. The per capita income for the town was $16,322.  About 10.9% of families and 15.9% of the population were below the poverty line, including 22.0% of those under age 18 and 5.1% of those age 65 or over.

Site of interest

 Mexico Historical Society & Museum

Colleges and universities

The Town of Mexico has immediate access to the University of Maine System's seven universities through University College at Rumford/Mexico. University College delivers courses and programs through a variety of modalities, including the traditional classroom, interactive television (ITV), video conferencing, online, and blended classes that use a variety of these modalities. University College provides services to faculty and students that include off-campus library services, academic advising, career development, application and financial aid assistance, computer access, technical support, and a place for adults to meet and study. Its students may take a few courses for personal growth or complete any of a number of programs.

Notable people 

 Chummy Broomhall, cross-country skier
 Ed McMahon, entertainment personality
 Charles W. Walton, US congressman

Climate

This climatic region has large seasonal temperature differences, with warm to hot (and often humid) summers and cold (sometimes severely cold) winters.  According to the Köppen Climate Classification system, Mexico has a humid continental climate, abbreviated "Dfb" on climate maps.

References

External links
 Town of Mexico, Maine
 Mexico Public Library
 Economic development info
 Maine Genealogy: Mexico, Oxford County, Maine

Towns in Oxford County, Maine
Towns in Maine